Leepu & Pitbull is an American reality television series featuring, mechanic and auto-garage shop owner, Steve "Pitbull" Trimboli and Bangladeshi car designer, Nizamuddin "Leepu" Awlia. Leepu transforms any type of vehicle into his own vision by taking hunks of scrap metal and creating a unique but affordable custom car for their clients out of Trimboli's Pit Bull Motors Inc. in Freeport, New York, on Long Island. The program premiered on Wednesday, June 23, 2015, at 10:00 pm EST on History.

Premise 
This reality series teams up master mechanic Steve `Pitbull' Trimboli with Leepu, a renowned car designer from Bangladesh. Together, their expertise has created a lucrative business. Each episode features a customer with a small budget, an interesting story, and a heap of metal that's special to him or her. Leepu and Pitbull's task is to turn the clunker into a cool custom automobile. The guys sometimes have a difference of opinion on ways to complete each job, but they ultimately make each customer happy, which to Pitbull, is key to running a successful business. 

Steve Pitbull is a fast-talking master mechanic who has built his business from the ground up. He counts every cent and never throws anything away. Pitbull has started a new custom car business with the world-famous Bangladeshi car designer known simply as Leepu, a colorful creative who takes junk automobiles and transforms these wrecks into stunning supercars using nothing but old hammers, sheet metal and spare parts. Together, Leepu and Pitbull turn junk into gold and build affordable custom muscle cars for the average Joe. 

Leepu is a brilliant designer, with a flare for dramatic builds. Pitbull is exactly the opposite—he has gasoline in his veins and worships horsepower. This odd couple needs each other to succeed, but it’s one of the strangest marriages in the history of the American automobile.

Each episode, a customer with a great story, small budget and sad old jalopy asks Pitbull and Leepu to transform his or her junker into a cool customized muscle car.

This ultimate odd couple experiences highs and lows while hunting for spare parts, ingenuous fixes and inspiration. Will the car be greater than the sum of the parts? Will the customers like the cars? Or will they ask for their money back?

Can these two homegrown geniuses from two different worlds work together to turn scrap into gold and realize the ultimate American muscle car dream?

Episodes

Broadcast
Internationally, the series premiered in Australia on A&E on October 14, 2015, and October 12 in Brazil. The series also airs in India on History TV 18.

References

External links
 
Pit Bull Motors Inc. official website
 

2010s American reality television series
2015 American television series debuts
Automotive television series
English-language television shows
History (American TV channel) original programming
Television shows set in New York (state)
2015 American television series endings